Askania-Nova (Ukrainian: Асканія-Нова), or New-Askania is an urban-type settlement in Kakhovka Raion, Kherson Oblast, southern Ukraine, near the Askania-Nova biosphere reserve. It hosts the administration of the Askania-Nova settlement hromada, one of the hromadas of Ukraine. It had a population of

Administrative status 
The settlement has been classified as urban since 1938. Until 18 July, 2020, Askania-Nova belonged to Chaplynka Raion. The raion was abolished in July 2020 as part of the administrative reform of Ukraine, which reduced the number of raions of Kherson Oblast to five. The area of Chaplynka Raion was merged into Kakhovka Raion.

History

It was established in 1822 as a rural settlement of Chapli. In 1828, the estate of Chapli was leased by Frederick Ferdinand, Duke of Anhalt-Köthen. The estate was renamed Neu-Askania, as the Duke's family held the title the Duke of Ascania since 1330. The 25 sheep breeders and German colonizers from that county founded the loosely populated settlement of Ascania-Nova.

Later, in 1835, it became a khutir of Askania-Nova. In 1856, a Ukrainian-born German entrepreneur Friedrich Fein bought the estate, which totaled approximately 52,000 ha, from the Duke of Anhalt-Dessau (presumably Leopold IV). Friedrich Fein was grandfather of Friedrich Falz-Fein, the founder of Askania Nova biosphere reserve. In 1890, it was known as the incorporated rural settlement of Askania-Nova.

See also 

 Russian occupation of Kherson Oblast

References

Notes

Sources
 Town stats

External links
Friedrich Fein Lineage 

Urban-type settlements in Kakhovka Raion
German communities in Ukraine